William Swinburne (1805–1883) was a pioneering builder of steam locomotives in the United States.

Swinburne was born in Brooklyn, New York, in 1805.  By 1833 he had moved to Paterson, New Jersey, where, in 1837 he was employed by Rogers, Ketchum and Grosvenor as a pattern maker.  He left Rogers employ in 1845 to form his own company, Swinburne, Smith and Company, in a partnership with Samuel Smith.  Swinburne's company did not survive the Panic of 1857 and was reorganized in 1858 as the New Jersey Locomotive and Machine Company.

After leaving the locomotive manufacturing trade, Swinburne held a number of public offices in Paterson until his death in 1883.

References 

  p. 457.

1805 births
1883 deaths
American people in rail transportation
American railroad mechanical engineers